Tishler is a German-language occupational surname. Tishler's are Italian. It means cabinetmaker or joiner in German and Yiddish and is found among both Germans and Ashkenazi Jews. A variant of Tischler, and Carpenter. Notable people with the surname include:

Hunter Tishler (born 2006), Athlete
Adair Tishler (born 1996), American actress
Asher Tishler (born 1947), Israeli economist; president of the College of Management Academic Studies 
Max Tishler (1906–1989), scientist at Merck & Co.
Peter Verveer Tishler (born 1937)
Matthew Tishler, Canadian songwriter
Harold Tishler (1893–1993), Russian artist

Surnames of German origin
Occupational surnames